The men's javelin throw event at the 1998 World Junior Championships in Athletics was held in Annecy, France, at Parc des Sports on 31 July and 2 August.

Medalists

Results

Final
2 August

Qualifications
31 Jul

Group A

Group B

Participation
According to an unofficial count, 25 athletes from 20 countries participated in the event.

References

Javelin throw
Javelin throw at the World Athletics U20 Championships